The Gulfstream Park Sprint Stakes is a Listed American Thoroughbred horse race for three-year-olds and older at a distance of six furlongs on the dirt run annually in early mid-February at Gulfstream Park in Hallandale Beach, Florida.  The event currently offers a purse of $150,000.

History
Inaugurated as the Gulfstream Park Sprint Championship, from 2003–2009 the race was run as the Richter Scale Sprint Handicap in honor of Richter Scale, who won the race in 2000. It reverted to the original name in 2010 for several years before it was renamed in 2020 as the World of Trouble Sprint Stakes. World of Trouble was a Grade I winner in 2019 on both turf and dirt.

The race has been run at a variety of distances:
 6 furlongs – 1987, 1990, 2019 to present
  furlongs – 2015–2018
 7 furlongs – 1972–1986, 1988–1989, 1991–2014

There was no race run in 1973, 1975, 1976, 1978–1980, and 1982.

For the 2020 the event was known as the World of Trouble Sprint Stakes.

Records
Speed record: 
 6 furlongs – 1:08.88 – Miles Ahead (2022)
 7 furlongs – 1:20.65 – Falling Sky (2014)

Most wins:
 No horse has won this race more than once

Most wins by a jockey:
 4 – Luis Saez (2014, 2018, 2019, 2020)

Most wins by a trainer:
 4 – Todd Pletcher (1998, 2004, 2007, 2010)

Winners 

* †  In 1990, Pentelicus won but was disqualified for interference and set back to second.

References

Graded stakes races in the United States
Horse races in Florida
Open mile category horse races
Flat horse races for four-year-olds
Recurring sporting events established in 1972
Gulfstream Park
1972 establishments in Florida
Grade 3 stakes races in the United States